Robin Hood is a 1912 film made by Eclair Studios. The film's costumes feature enormous versions of the familiar hats of Robin and his merry men, and uses the unusual effect of momentarily superimposing images of different animals over each character to emphasize their good or evil qualities.  The film was directed by Étienne Arnaud and Herbert Blaché, and written by Eustace Hale Ball. A restored copy of the 30-minute film exists and was exhibited in 2006 at the Museum of Modern Art in New York City.

Cast

 Robert Frazer ... Robin Hood
Barbara Tennant ... Maid Marian
 Alec B. Francis ... Sheriff of Nottingham
 Julia Stuart ... Sheriff's Housekeeper
 Mathilde Baring ... Maid at Merwyn's
Isabel Lamon ... Fennel
 Muriel Ostriche ... Christabel
 M. E. Hannefy ... Friar Tuck
 Guy Oliver ... Guy Oliver
 George Larkin ... Alan-a-Dale
 Charles Hundt ... Will Scarlet
 John Troyano ... Much
 Arthur Hollingsworth	... Richard the Lion-Hearted
 Lamar Johnstone ... Guy of Gisbourne
 John G. Adolfi ... Thomas Merwin
 Gonzalo Meroño ... Richard Steward
Jaime Sánchez ... Matt Edward
Adrián López ... John Murphy
Pablo Alvarez Fraile ... Will Tuck
Alejandro Campillo Yañez ... Lamon Yañez Sarasa

References

External links

Robin Hood at the Internet Movie Database

1912 films
Silent American drama films
American silent short films
Films about outlaws
American black-and-white films
1912 drama films
1912 short films
Robin Hood films
Films shot in Fort Lee, New Jersey
1910s English-language films
Films directed by Herbert Blaché
1910s American films
Silent adventure films